Antin Infrastructure Partners is a private equity firm focused on infrastructure investment, with offices in Paris, London and Luxembourg.

History
Antin was founded in Paris in 2007. Initially sponsored by BNP Paribas, the firm bought out the bank's 40% stake in 2012. Led by former banker Alain Rauscher, Antin manages four funds for infrastructure investment in Europe and North America, each with a focus on telecommunications, transportation, energy and the environment, or social sectors. In 2014, the firm owned a third of all trains running in the UK. As of September 2021, Antin had 75 partners and over 65 professional staff.

Antin sponsors a research chair in private equity and infrastructure at HEC Paris, which in 2019 was held by Denis Gromb, Professor, Finance Department.

Investments
In September 2014 it was announced that the Israeli conglomerate Delek Group was selling UK freeway services company Roadchef to Antin for £153 million.

Between 2014 and 2015, Antin acquired a 99% stake in Central Area Transmission System, a natural gas transportation and processing system, from BG Group.

In July 2018, Antin announced that it was seeking to raise €5 billion for its fourth fund, having raised €3.6 billion for its third in 2016. In April 2019, more than €2.5 billion had been committed.

In September 2018, Antin was reported as having raised €8 billion, and to have invested in 22 companies. In August 2019, Antin sold a minority stake in Eurofiber, a Dutch fiber-optic network, to PGGM, after having bought the company for 875 million Euros in 2015.

In late 2019, Antin acquired the U.S. district energy assets of Veolia to establish Vicinity Energy.

In late 2020, Antin was reported as acquiring Babilou, a French nursery operator, and Hippocrates Holding, an Italian pharmacy network. In 2021, it acquired Pulsant, a provider of datacenter services.

On September 24, 2021, its IPO was the largest to date on Euronext for 2021, with Antin shares set at €24 per share, then surging to close at €30, giving the firm a value of about 5.1 billion euros. Prior to its IPO, the firm was valued at four billion Euros.

Controversies

In January 2023, a social infrastructure provider owned by Antin - The Hesley Group - was the subject of an investigation by BBC News. BBC News reported that children in care were punched, locked out naked, and had vinegar poured on cuts. The complaints were raised 3 years prior to the closure of the children's home. The BBC commissionned research that found more than a quarter of all children's home placements in England and Wales were run by private equity firms and criticised the alleged lack of accountability in the sector.

References

Private equity firms of the United Kingdom
Financial services companies established in 2007
2007 establishments in France
Investment companies of France